Essex Road is a National Rail station in Canonbury in Greater London, England, and is on the Northern City Line between  and ,  down the line from , and is in Travelcard Zone 2. The station is at the junction of Essex Road, Canonbury Road and New North Road, with the present entrance on Canonbury Road. Operated by Great Northern, it is the only deep-level underground station in London served exclusively by National Rail trains. Between 1933 and 1975 the station was operated as part of the London Underground, as a short branch of the Northern line. Between 1922 and 1948 the station name was Canonbury & Essex Road. The name reverted to the original form in 1948.

History
The station was opened on 14 February 1904 by the Great Northern & City Railway (GN&CR) on its underground route between the Great Northern Railway (GNR) station at Finsbury Park and the Metropolitan Railway (MR) and City & South London Railway (C&SLR) station at Moorgate in the City of London.

The GN&CR was intended to carry main line trains and the tunnels were constructed with a larger diameter (16 ft/4.9 m) than the other deep tube railways being built at that time (roughly 11 to 12 ft/3.4 m to 3.7 m). From 1913 the MR took control of the GN&CR and ran it under its own name until it became part of the London Passenger Transport Board (LPTB) in 1933. In preparation for the LPTB's "Northern Heights" plan the line was transferred to the control of the Morden-Edgware Line (now the Northern line).

By 1939 much of the work for the connection of the lines had been done and the opening of the connection was scheduled for autumn 1940 but the start of World War II put a halt to further construction. After the war the uncompleted parts of the plan were cancelled and Northern line trains continued to run to Finsbury Park on what became known as the Northern City Line or, from 1970, the Northern line Highbury Branch.

The station was, from the early 1960s, closed on Sundays. In the 1970s it was also closed on Saturdays.

The Northern City Line was closed on 4 October 1975 (due to its weekend closure, Essex Road closed the day before) and ceased to be part of the London Underground. On 8 November 1976, seventy-two years after the GN&CR first opened, the line was opened fully for main line trains from Moorgate to Finsbury Park and beyond as had been originally intended. It is the only underground station on this line not operated by London Underground or Transport for London.

By comparison with other underground stations built at the beginning of the 20th century, the station's surface building is nondescript and unremarkable. Unlike many other central London underground stations, Essex Road was never modernised with escalators and access to the platforms is by lift or a spiral staircase. The station also lacks the automatic ticket gates present at most London Underground and many National Rail stations. Far fewer passengers use Essex Road station, only 0.77 million entries and exits during 2019-20, compared to nearby Angel tube station, with 17.7 million for 2019.

At the lower level the lifts and staircase (of 157 steps) are connected to the platforms via a passageway and a short staircase rising between the two tunnels. The Underground's former operation of the station is evident from the unused and rusty fourth rail which once provided a return of the current from the tube trains serving the line. The third rail is still in use, with return now through the running rails. Signs at street and platform level still reference Network SouthEast, even though it is now Great Northern that manage and serve this station.

Services
All services at Essex Road are operated by Great Northern using  EMUs.

The typical off-peak service in trains per hour is:
 4 tph to 
 2 tph to  via 
 2 tph to 

During the peak hours, the station is served by an additional half-hourly service between Moorgate and Hertford North and the service between Moorgate and Welwyn Garden City is increased to 4 tph.

Connections
London Buses routes 38, 56, 73, 271, 341 and 476 and night routes N38 and N73 serve the station.

Future
Essex Road was a station on the proposed Chelsea-Hackney line. However, the scheme currently being pursued by the developers of Crossrail, known as Crossrail 2, does not provide for an interchange at Essex Road.

References

External links 

London Transport Museum Photographic Archive
 
 
 

Proposed Chelsea-Hackney Line stations
Railway stations in the London Borough of Islington
Former Great Northern and City Railway stations
Railway stations in Great Britain opened in 1904
Railway stations in Great Britain closed in 1975
Railway stations in Great Britain opened in 1976
Railway stations served by Govia Thameslink Railway
Unopened Northern Heights extension stations
1904 establishments in England
1975 disestablishments in England
1976 establishments in England